Itana Grbić, (born 1 September 1996) is a Montenegrin handball player who plays for Brest Bretagne Handball and the Montenegrin national team.

Itana is the younger sister of Montenegrin footballer Petar Grbić.

International honours 
EHF Champions League
Third place: 2015

Individual awards 
 All-Star Left Wing of the Youth World Championship: 2014 
 Handball-Planet.com Young World Left Wing of the Season: 2017

References

External links

Montenegrin female handball players
1996 births
Living people
Sportspeople from Podgorica
Olympic handball players of Montenegro
Handball players at the 2020 Summer Olympics
Montenegrin expatriate sportspeople in North Macedonia
Montenegrin expatriate sportspeople in Romania
Expatriate handball players
Mediterranean Games medalists in handball
Mediterranean Games silver medalists for Montenegro
Competitors at the 2018 Mediterranean Games